Jamadagni is a 1988 Indian Telugu-language action film starring Ghattamaneni Krishna in the titular role of a journalist who fights against a cunning politician enacted by Kaikala Satyanarayana. Radha played the female lead while Sumalatha, Charu Hassan, Gollapudi Maruti Rao and Kakinada Shyamala played other supporting roles. The film directed by Bharathiraja had musical score by Ilayaraja. It was dubbed in Tamil as Naarkaali Kanavugal which never got released.

Cast

Soundtrack 
Ilayaraja scored and composed the film's soundtrack album.

Citations

External links 

1988 films
Indian political films
Films directed by Bharathiraja
Films scored by Ilaiyaraaja
1980s Telugu-language films